Constitution (foaled February 11, 2011) is an American Thoroughbred racehorse and the winner of the 2015 Donn Handicap.He is also known for being the sire of 2020 Belmont Stakes winner, Tiz the Law.

Career

Constitution's first race was on January 11, 2014, at Gulfstream Park, where he came in first in a Maiden Special Weight race. He then followed it up with another victory on February 22, 2014, in an Allowance Optional Claiming race at Gulfstream Park.

On March 29, 2014, he picked up his first graded race win when he won the Grade 1 Florida Derby, beating Wildcat Red by a neck.

He came in 4th in an Allowance Optional Claiming race at Belmont Park on October 12, 2014. Then on November 28th, 2014, at the Grade-1 Clark Handicap, he came in 3rd place behind race winner Hoppertunity and Protonico.

He started off his 2015 season strong by picking up a Grade-1 win at the February 7th, 2015, Donn Handicap. He won by 3/4th's of a length. The win would end up being his last victory of his career.

He came in 5th at the September 7th 2015 Grade-2 Bernard Baruch Handicap and retired after a 6th-place finish at the Grade-1 Jockey Gold Cup Stakes on October 3, 2015.

Constitution was retired to stud for Winstar Farm soon after his final race in October 2015.

Stud career 

Pedigree descendants include:

c = colt, f = filly

Pedigree

References

2011 racehorse births